was a Japanese scriptwriter and novelist. His major works include anime Space Warrior Baldios, the Magical Princess Minky Momo series, and Pokémon, of which he created the Pokémon Lugia. He had a reputation for his witty dialogue and was known for the unusual next episode previews in the series he served as chief writer for. In Pokémon, he coined Team Rocket's iconic motto. He was also a member of the Writers Guild of Japan.

His father, served as Fukuoka Prefecture's lieutenant governor, local vice-minister and chairman of the local finance association.

Career
Shudo was born in Fukuoka Prefecture, but moved to Tokyo, Sapporo, and Nara Prefecture when he was a child because his father was a government official, and he attributes his dry, non-indigenous style to this experience. When he failed the college entrance exams, he read a specialized magazine that his younger sister had bought, Scenario, which led him to enroll in a screenplay institute with the funds he had saved up to go to prep school. He got recognized for the screenplays he had written there, and in 1969, at the age of 19, he made his debut as a scriptwriter in the 45th episode of the TV historical drama Ōedo Sōsamō. However, he got tired of fixing scripts that he did not agree with and stopped writing altogether, claiming he got fed up with penning human drama pieces, so he spent the rest of his time working as a salesman for educational equipment and various ceremonial occasions, while at the same time helping out with shōjo manga original stories and plots for TV dramas without taking credit for any of his work. Later, he roamed Europe with the money he had saved from his salesman job, and when he returned to Japan after running out, with the help of his acquaintance, screenwriter Fukiko Miyauchi, he returned to work as a scriptwriter in 1976 for an episode from Manga Sekai Mukashibanashi, an anime TV series produced by Dax International. Since then, he worked on Dax's several other serials, such as Paris no Isabelle and Manga Hajimete Monogatari.

In the early 1980s, he also worked on Tatsunoko Production's works, but it was Magical Princess Minky Momo and GoShogun, both of which were produced at Ashi Productions, where he was in charge of everything from the original idea to story editing, that revealed his talent as an author. In 1984, he won the Best Screenplay Award at the first Japan Anime Awards for Manga Hajimete Monogatari, Magical Princess Minky Momo, and Sasuga Sarutobi. He also worked as a novelist, with his best known work being the Eternal Filena series. He worked with Kunihiko Yuyama, the main director of both works, in the 1990s on the sequel to Minky Momo and later Pocket Monsters.

His biggest contribution to the Pocket Monsters (Pokémon) franchise was the creation of Lugia. Shudo was interested in creating a darker storyline for the franchise that he otherwise was not allowed to do when working on the series and hoped that the Pokémon series would be his chance to bring those ideas to life. After Lugia's creation, many changes were made by the staff that Shudo had found displeasing, such as making Lugia male (he considered Lugia female) and interjecting him into the main series of games (Shudo wanted him to be exclusive to the movie). Before, during and after Lugia's creation, Shudo would heavily consume alcohol and tranquilizers, which he claimed cleared his mind when working, and it contributed to his failing health.

In his later years, he contributed articles to the website Anime Style and worked on feature films. The materials for the major works he was involved in, such as screenplays, have been donated to the Odawara Public Library in Odawara, Kanagawa Prefecture, where he once used to live. Some of the materials held by the library are on permanent display at the Odawara Museum of Literature.

On October 28, 2010, he collapsed after suffering a subarachnoid hemorrhage in a smoking room at JR-West Nara Station in Nara, Nara Prefecture, where he was visiting, and was rushed to the hospital. However, he died on the next day at the age of 61. In 2011, a memorial exhibition titled "In Memoriam of the Screenwriter Takeshi Shudo" was held at the Suginami Animation Museum in Suginami, Tokyo.

The 2017 anime film, Pokémon the Movie: I Choose You!, credits Shudo as partial screenwriter in the staff roll, as he wrote the script for the first episode of the TV anime, which was used as the base for the early part of the film.

Works
 series head writer denoted in bold

TV Anime 
Manga Furusato Mukashibanashi (1976)
Manga Hajimete Monogatari (1978–1984)
Paris no Isabelle (1979)
Manga Sarutobi Sasuke (1979–1980)
Space Warrior Baldios (1980–1981)
Muteking, The Dashing Warrior (1981)
Toshishun (1981)
GoShogun (1981)
Golden Warrior Gold Lightan (1981-1982)
Dash Kappei (1981–1982)
Thunderbirds 2086 (1982)
Acrobunch (1982)
Magical Princess Minky Momo (1982–1983)
Sasuga no Sarutobi (1982–1984)
Stop!! Hibari-kun! (1983)
Taotao (1983–1985)
Video Warrior Laserion (1984)
Chikkun Takkun (1984)
Manga Doshite Monogatari (1984–1986)
Manga Naruhodo Monogatari (1986–1988)
Shin Manga Naruhodo Monogatari (1988)
Manga Hajimete Omoshirojuku (1989)
Idol Angel Yokoso Yoko (1990–1991)
Magical Princess Minky Momo: Hold on to Your Dreams (1991–1992)
Chō Kuse ni Narisō (1994–1995)
Martian Successor Nadesico (1996–1997)
Pokémon (1997–2002)
Pokémon: Mewtwo Returns (2000)
Dancouga Nova - Super God Beast Armor (2007)

Film
Legend of the Galactic Heroes: My Conquest is the Sea of Stars (1988)
Pokémon: The First Movie (1998)
Pokémon: The Movie 2000 (1999)
Pokémon 3: The Movie (2000)
Pokémon the Movie: I Choose You! (2017)
Pokémon: Mewtwo Strikes Back—Evolution (2019)

OVA
Radio City Fantasy (1984)
GoShogun: The Time Étranger (1985)
Magical Princess Minky Momo: La Ronde in my Dream (1985)
Cosmos Pink Shock (1986)
Legend of the Galactic Heroes (1988)
Eternal Filena (1992–1993)
Minky Momo in The Bridge Over Dreams  (1993)
Minky Momo in The Station of Your Memories (1994)

Novels
Eternal Filena
Pocket Monsters The Animation
 Vol. 1: Departure
 Vol. 2: Friends

References

External links

Takeshi Shudo's Anime Style articles (Japanese)
Takeshi Shudo's blog (Japanese)
 Obituary by Jonathan Clements

1949 births
2010 deaths
Japanese writers
Pokémon
University of Tokyo alumni
Writers from Fukuoka (city)